Jon Joseph Allen (born 10 December 1950) is a retired Canadian diplomat. He was Ambassador to Spain from 2012 to 2016 and Ambassador Extraordinary and Plenipotentiary to Israel from 2006 until 2010, when he was replaced by Paul Hunt. He was Canada's third Jewish ambassador to Israel (the other two were Norman Spector and David Berger).

Born in Winnipeg, Manitoba, Allen received a degree in international law from the University of London.

References

External links 
 Foreign Affairs and International Trade Canada Complete List of Posts

1950 births
Living people
Canadian Jews
Ambassadors of Canada to Israel
Alumni of the University of London
People from Winnipeg